Frederick Conrad (1759August 3, 1827) was a member of the U.S. House of Representatives from Pennsylvania. He was also a slaveholder.

Early life
Frederick Conrad was born near Worcester Township in the Province of Pennsylvania.

Employment
He was elected to the Pennsylvania General Assembly in 1798, 1800, and 1802.  He served as paymaster of the Fifty-first Regiment of Pennsylvania Militia in 1804 and 1805.

Political life
Conrad was elected as a Democratic-Republican to the Eighth and Ninth Congresses.  He served as chairman of the United States House Committee on Accounts during the Ninth Congress.  He was appointed justice of the peace 1807, prothonotary and clerk of the courts in 1821, and reappointed in 1824.  He resided near Center Point, Pennsylvania, and was interested in agricultural pursuits.  He moved to Norristown, Pennsylvania, and died there in 1827.  Interment in Wentz's Reformed Church Cemetery in Center Point, Pennsylvania.

References

Sources

The Political Graveyard

1759 births
1827 deaths
People from Montgomery County, Pennsylvania
People of colonial Pennsylvania
American people of German descent
Democratic-Republican Party members of the United States House of Representatives from Pennsylvania
Pennsylvania prothonotaries
American slave owners
American militia officers